Dubrovka is a rural locality (a selo) in Amursky Selsoviet of Belogorsky District, Amur Oblast, Russia. The population was 62 as of 2018. There are 6 streets.

Geography 
Dubrovka is located 46 km southeast of Belogorsk (the district's administrative centre) by road. Vozzhayevka is the nearest rural locality.

References 

Rural localities in Belogorsky District